Kristoffer Hoven (born 8 July 1990) is a Norwegian football defender who currently plays for Østsiden IL.

References

1990 births
Living people
People from Våler, Østfold
Norwegian footballers
Moss FK players
Sarpsborg 08 FF players
Fredrikstad FK players
SK Sprint-Jeløy players
Østsiden IL players
Eliteserien players
Norwegian First Division players
Association football defenders
Norway youth international footballers
Sportspeople from Viken (county)